Events in the year 1971 in Bulgaria.

Incumbents 

 General Secretaries of the Bulgarian Communist Party: Todor Zhivkov
 Chairmen of the Council of Ministers: Todor Zhivkov (from 1962 until July 7) Stanko Todorov (from July 7 until 1981)

Events 

 18 May – The Zhivkov Constitution (which was the third Constitution of Bulgaria and the second of the Communist era) came into effect.

Sports 

 June 19 – 27 – The 1971 European Weightlifting Championships, the 50th edition of the event, were held at the Universiada Hall in Sofia, Bulgaria. There were 123 participants from 23 nations.

References 

 
1970s in Bulgaria
Years of the 20th century in Bulgaria
Bulgaria
Bulgaria